Samaris is a genus of crested flounders native to the Indo-Pacific.

Samaris may also refer to:

Samariscus, a genus of crested flounders native to the Indo-Pacific
Samaris (band), an Icelandic electronic music band
Andreas Samaris (born 1989), Greek footballer